The 2019 Tohoku Rakuten Golden Eagles season was the fifteenth season of the Tohoku Rakuten Golden Eagles franchise. The Eagles played their home games at Rakuten Seimei Park Miyagi in the city of Sendai as members of Nippon Professional Baseball's Pacific League. The team was led by Yosuke Hiraishi in his first and only season as team manager.

They were eliminated by the Fukuoka SoftBank Hawks in the First Stage in three games.

Regular season standings

Record vs. opponents

Interleague

Opening Day roster 
Friday, March 29, 2019, vs. Chiba Lotte Marines

References

Tohoku Rakuten Golden Eagles
Tohoku Rakuten Golden Eagles seasons